Steve Darcis and Dominik Meffert were the defending champions from 2010 as there was no event in 2011 and 2012, but decided no to participate.

Nikola Ćirić and Goran Tošić won the final against Maximilian Neuchrist and Mate Pavić 6–3, 6–7(5–7), [10–8].

Seeds

Draw

Draw

References
 Main Draw

Morocco Tennis Tour - Tangerandnbsp;- Doubles
2013 Doubles
2013 Morocco Tennis Tour